Mastax pulchella is a species of beetle in the family Carabidae found in China and India.

References

Mastax pulchella
Beetles of Asia
Beetles described in 1831